The National Front (NF) was a far-right political party in Hungary during the late 1930s.

History
The party was formed in October 1936 by Ferenc Rajniss and János Salló. In the 1939 elections the NF won three seats. In 1939 they merged with the Christian National Socialist Front under the leadership of Károly Maróthy.

Election results

National Assembly

References

Defunct political parties in Hungary
Political parties established in 1936
1936 establishments in Hungary
Far-right political parties in Hungary
Nazi parties